Independent Days Festival was an Italian music festival that took place every September in Bologna. In June 2017, the festival was held in Monza.

About

History 
Statistics:
20.000 revellers in 1999
40.000 revellers in 2000
40,000 revellers in 2001

The site

The Stages 
Arena Parco Nord is the location of the main stage – a grass field with a curved banking giving an amphitheatre shape.

TENDA ESTRAGON is the tent which houses the second stage. The festival takes place as part of Festa de l'Unità – a popular outdoor festival full of restaurants, beer tents, and entertainment. Although the two stages are not connected, you are allowed to move between the two, enabling festival goers to enjoy all the attractions of the Festa de l'Unità. Traditionally the festival has had a punk theme, but in recent years, more mainstream acts have played, such as Franz Ferdinand, Editors, Maxïmo Park, and The Bravery.

The billing

2012 
Angels & Airwaves, Social Distortion, All Time Low

2011 
Arctic Monkeys, Kasabian, The Wombats, The Offspring, No Use for a Name, Face to Face

2010 
The Leeches, All Time Low, Simple Plan, Sum 41, Blink-182

2009 
Deep Purple, The Kooks, Kasabian, Twisted Wheel, Expatriate, The Hacienda

2008 
It did not take place

2007 
Nine Inch Nails, Tool, Maxïmo Park, Hot Hot Heat, ...And You Will Know Us by the Trail of Dead, Billy Talent, Petrol

2006 
One year hiatus

2005 
Bad Religion, Queens of the Stone Age, The Blood Brothers, The Bravery, Editors, The Futureheads, Maxïmo Park, Meganoidi, Skin, Social Distortion, Forty Winks, Marsh Mallows, The Peawees, Sikitikis

2004 
Sonic Youth, Franz Ferdinand, The Libertines, Mark Lanegan, Mondo Generator, Tre Allegri Ragazzi Morti, Colour Of Fire, Blueskins, Julie's Haircut, Raydaytona, The Darkness, Velvet Revolver, MC 5, Lars Frederiksen, Auf Der Maur, The Dirtbombs, New Found Glory, Thee S.T.P., Persiana Jones, Derozer, Radio 4, Everlast, Feist, Madbones, Friday Star, Morticia Lovers, Flogging Molly, Yellowcard, Vanilla Sky, Coheed and Cambria, Young Heart Attack, Ghetto Ways, Forty Winks, The No One, Wet Tones

2003 
Rancid, The Cramps, The Mars Volta, Radio Birdman, Nashville Pussy, Lagwagon, A.F.I, Alkaline Trio, The Ataris, Mad Caddies, Fratelli Di Soledad, Thrice, The Hormonauts, Los Fastidios, Immortal Lee County Killers, Bigoz Quartet, All American Rejects, Punx Crew, The Peawees, Forty Winks
Motorama, Thee S.T.P., Kim's Teddy Bears, Moravagine, Le Braghe Corte, Marsh Mallows, Karnea, Coffee Shower

2002 
Subsonica, NOFX, The Jon Spencer Blues Explosion, Modena City Ramblers, Sick of It All, No Use for a Name, Punkreas, Meganoidi, The Music, Something Corporate, Pulley, Bouncing Souls, Ikara Colt, D4

2001 
Man or Astro-man?, Mogwai, Eels, Turin Brakes, Ed Harcourt, I Am Kloot, The (International) Noise Conspiracy, Micevice, Boy Hits Cart, Cut, Scarlet, The Valentines, Manu Chao, Muse, Africa Unite, Ska-P, Modena City Ramblers, Rocket From The Crypt, Mad Caddies, Reel Big Fish, Banda Bassotti, Meganoidi, Persiana Jones, Tre Allegri Ragazzi Morti, Backyard Babies

2000 
Tenda Festival
Saturday 2 : Mr. Bungle, Boss Hog, Andre Williams, Slim, Titan
Arena Parco Nord
Sunday 3 : Blink 182, Limp Bizkit, Deftones, Millencolin, Verdena, Punkreas, No Use for a Name, Muse

1999 
The Offspring, Joe Strummer & The Mescaleros, Silverchair, Sick of It All, Hepcat, Lit, Punkreas, Verdena, Tre Allegri Ragazzi Morti

External links 
Official website (archived)

Rock festivals in Italy